Campo is a town on the Atlantic Ocean coast of southern Cameroon, where it is the main border town for travel to Equatorial Guinea.  The town is just north of the mouth of the Ntem River, that is to say the right bank of that river.

It lies near the Campo Ma'an National Park. Campo has traces of German colonial heritage, most notably in the public building on the beachfront near the city centre. Campo hosts the Campo Subdivision of the Ocean Division and its sub-divisional officer (SDO). The town has road links to Kribi along the coast and to Ma'an and Ebolowa via the road through Campo Ma'an National Park.

Tourism is increasing in Campo, mostly of visitors to the National Park. The town hosts the Headquarters of the National Park where entrance fees need to be paid.

See also
Communes of Cameroon

Populated places in South Region (Cameroon)